Ashwari is a village in Pindra Tehsil of Varanasi district in the Indian state of Uttar Pradesh. Ashwari has its own gram panchayat by the same name as the village. The village is about 42.0 kilometers North-West of Varanasi city, 273 kilometers South-East of state capital Lucknow and 791 kilometers South-East of the national capital Delhi.

Demography
Ashwari has a total population of 1,372 people amongst 215 families. Sex ratio of Ashwari is 1,030 and child sex ratio is 1,132. Uttar Pradesh state average for both ratios is 912 and 902 respectively .

Transportation
Ashwari can be accessed by road and does not have a railway station of its own. Closest railway station to this village is Babatpur railway station (17 kilometers East). Nearest operational airports are Varanasi airport (16.5 kilometers East) and Allahabad Airports (129 kilometers West).

See also

Pindra Tehsil
Pindra (Assembly constituency)

Notes
  All demographic data is based on 2011 Census of India.

References 

Villages in Varanasi district